In developed nations around the world, the lower middle class is a subdivision of the greater middle class. Universally, the term refers to the group of middle class households or individuals who have not attained the status of the upper middle class associated with the higher realms of the middle class, hence the name.

United States 

In American society, the middle class may be divided into two or three sub-groups. When divided into two parts, the lower middle class, also sometimes simply referred to as "middle class", consists of roughly one third of households, roughly twice as large as the upper middle or managerial class. Common occupation fields are semi-professionals, such as lower-level managers, small business owners and skilled craftsmen. These individuals commonly have some college education or perhaps a Bachelor's degree and earn a comfortable living. Already among the largest social classes, rivaled only by the working class, the American lower middle class is diverse and growing.

Though not common in sociological models, the middle class may be divided into three sections in vernacular language usage. In this system the term lower middle class relates to the demographic referred to as working class in most sociological models. Yet some class models, such as those by sociologist Leonard Beeghley, suggest the middle class to be one cohesive socio-economic demographic, including the demographics otherwise referred to as lower, simply middle or upper middle class in one group comprising about 45% of households.

Social class in the US at a glance

Usage in popular culture 

The lower-middle class is frequently portrayed in television and film. Notable examples include the television shows The Simpsons, All In The Family, Malcolm in the Middle, Married... with Children, 2point4 children, The Middle, Family Guy, Family Matters and Veronica Mars as well as films such as Lady Bird and Soul Food.

See also 
Middle class
Underclass
Upper class
Upper middle class
Working class

References 
Notes

Bibliography

Middle class